Ottosonderia is a genus of flowering plants belonging to the family Aizoaceae.

Its native range is the Cape Provinces in South Africa.

The genus name of Ottosonderia is in honour of Otto Wilhelm Sonder (1812–1881), a German botanist and pharmacist. 
It was first described and published in Notes Mesembryanthemum Vol.3 on page 292 in 1958.

Known species
According to Kew:
Ottosonderia monticola 
Ottosonderia obtusa

References

Aizoaceae
Aizoaceae genera
Plants described in 1958
Flora of the Cape Provinces
Taxa named by Louisa Bolus